Crotaphopeltis barotseensis is a species of snake of the family Colubridae.

Geographic range
The snake is found in Botswana and Zambia.

References 

Reptiles described in 1968
Reptiles of Botswana
Reptiles of Zambia
Colubrids